Burns Creek is a rural locality in the local government area (LGA) of Launceston in the Launceston LGA region of Tasmania. The 2016 census recorded a population of 35 for the state suburb of Burns Creek.

History 
Burns Creek was gazetted as a locality in 1963.

Geography
The North Esk River forms most of the southern boundary.

Road infrastructure 
Route C415 (Burns Creek Road) passes through from west to south.

References

Towns in Tasmania
Localities of City of Launceston